The Vaucluse Historic District, located in Vaucluse, South Carolina in Aiken County. The district includes the mill, number of accompanying buildings, and over eighty mill village homes. The district is noteworthy in that it is considered to be oldest mill village in the state.  No less significant, the mill building, completed in 1877, was based on the plans of engineers A. D. Lockwood & Company of Providence, Rhode Island. The Lockwood successor firm, Lockwood, Greene & Company, would later design around fifty of South Carolina's textile manufacturing facilities. The Vancluse Historic District was listed in the National Register of Historic Places on May 7, 1996.

References

Greek Revival architecture in South Carolina
Historic districts in Aiken County, South Carolina
National Register of Historic Places in Aiken County, South Carolina
Historic districts on the National Register of Historic Places in South Carolina